Tracy Johnson may refer to:

 Tracy Johnson (American football) (born 1966), American former football running back
 Tracy L. Johnson, professor of biology

See also
 Tracey Johnson, American former baseball player
 Traci Johnson, candidate in the 2022 United States Senate election in Ohio